The Framingham Centre Common Historic District encompasses the historic early center of Framingham, Massachusetts.  It is centered on the old town common, which is west of Edgell Road, a short way north of the busy commercial corridor of Massachusetts Route 9.  The district includes 28 buildings, among them important early civic structures such as the Village Hall, old Edgell Memorial Library, First Parish Church, and the former Framingham Academy building.

The district was listed on the National Register of Historic Places in 1990.

See also
National Register of Historic Places listings in Framingham, Massachusetts

References

Historic districts in Framingham, Massachusetts
National Register of Historic Places in Middlesex County, Massachusetts
Historic districts on the National Register of Historic Places in Massachusetts